River Inn may refer to:

Inn (river), Switzerland, Austria, and Germany.
River Inn (Fergus Falls, Minnesota), USA
River Inn (Reno, Nevada), USA